534 km is a rural locality (a passing loop) in Kalarskoye Rural Settlement of Tashtagolsky District, Russia. The population was 13 as of 2010.

Streets 
 Vesyolaya

Geography 
534 km is located 35 km northwest of Tashtagol (the district's administrative centre) by road. Kalary is the nearest rural locality.

References 

Rural localities in Kemerovo Oblast